DCL1 (an abbreviation of Dicer-like 1) is a gene in plants that codes for the DCL1 protein, a ribonuclease III enzyme involved in processing double-stranded RNA (dsRNA) and microRNA (miRNA). Although DCL1, also called Endoribonuclease Dicer homolog 1, is named for its homology with the metazoan protein Dicer, its role in miRNA biogenesis is somewhat different, due to substantial differences in miRNA maturation processes between plants and animals, as well due to additional downstream plant-specific pathways, where DCL1 paralogs like DCL4 participate, such Trans-acting siRNA biogenesis.

Function 
DCL1 is localized exclusively in the plant cell nucleus, together with the  double-stranded RNA binding protein Hyponastic Leaves1 (HYL1), CTD-Phosphatase-Like1 (CPL1) and the zinc finger protein SERRATE (SE), form nuclear dicing bodies or D-bodies. In these membraneless organelles, pri-miRNAs are recognized and processes into pre-miRNAs and subsecuently into mature miRNA duplexes, by the binding of additional proteins such as Constitutive Alterations in the Small RNAs Pathways9 (CARP9).  In plants, DCL1 is responsible both for processing a primary miRNA to a pre-miRNA, and for then processing the pre-miRNA to a mature miRNA.  In animals, the equivalents of these two steps are carried out by different proteins; First, pri-miRNA processing takes place in the nucleus by the ribonuclease Drosha as part of the Microprocessor complex. Second and finally processing to a mature miRNA takes place in the cytoplasm by Dicer to yield a mature miRNA.

PAZ domain plasticity 
In animals, hairpin-containing primary transcripts (pri-miRNAs) are cleaved by Drosha to generate precursor-miRNAs, a double strand palindromic structure typically call hairpin pre-miRNAs, which are subsequently cleaved by Dicer to generate mature miRNAs. Instead of being cleaved by two different enzymes, both cleavages in plants are performed by Dicer-like 1 (DCL1), despite of a similar domain architecuture between both homologgous enzymes. Recent single-particle cryo-electron microscopy structures of both complexs of dsRNA structures (pri-RNA and pre-miRNA) as ligand of Arabidopsis DCL1, in cleavege-competent state, suggest that PAZ domain plasticity allow its to get involved in pri-miRNA and pre-miRNA recognition, posibilited by an internal loop binding groove of this protein domain, which serves as an engine that transfers the substrate between two sequential cleavage events.

Other dicer-like proteins 

Although DCL1 is responsible for the majority of the miRNA processing in plants, most plants contain an additional set of DCLs proteins with related roles in RNA processing, the number of additional members of the same family depends on the plant familiy. For instance, in Brassicaceae there are 5 additional paralog genes to DLC1, DCL2, DCL3, DCL4 and two RNASE II-LIKE genes RTL1 and RTL2; Howeversome dicots such as Populus trichocarpa as well the majority of monocots plants have five to six DCLs, where DCL2 and DCL3 suffered an additional duplication into the genes DCL2a and DCL2. DCL3's duplication is monocot-specifict, generating the genes DCL3a and DCL3b, also called DCL3 and DCL5 respectively.

References 

Ribonucleases
Plant proteins